The Kronstadt Sea Cadet Corps is a military boarding school of the Russian Navy.

History 
The corps follows the traditions maintained by the original Russian cadet corps in the Imperial Russian Navy. The process of its creation began on 25 April 1995 by order of the Mayor of St. Petersburg Anatoly Sobchak. The corps was created at the insistence of President Boris Yeltsin and a joint decision Minister of Defense Pavel Grachev and Mayor Sobchak. On 1 October, the first 75 pupils were enrolled in the corps at Komarovo. On 22 November, First Deputy Commander-in-Chief of the Navy, Admiral Igor Kasatonov presented to the cadet corps its first regimental colours. This day became an official holiday in the school. In early 1996, it was transformed into a naval educational institution. The decree on 19 February of that year established a seven-year training period for the cadet corps. By August of that year, the maximum capacity was determined at 700 pupils. In 2000, the first graduation ceremony took place. On 1 December 2012, Admiral Viktor Chirkov presented new colours to the corps in a presentation ceremony.

General information 
Only boys of 10–11 years old who are admitted into the corps. The building has 28 classrooms, 24 classrooms, with the science rooms being featuring with laboratories equipped with modern equipment. From the seventh grade, cadets learn two foreign languages: the English language and the German language. The building has an assembly hall for 200 people, and a reading room for 50 seats. Cadets train on training ships in the city. Upon graduation from the corps, cadets receive a secondary education certificate and a breastplate, having the right to enter higher military academies of the Ministry of Defense of Russia without exams.

Members of the corps of drums of the cadet corps open all Victory Day Parade and parade in honor of the Siege of Leningrad on Palace Square. Members of the corps have also participated in the Moscow Victory Day Parade on Red Square. The corps has an official coat of arms and anthem.

Awards 
 Cup of the Commander-in-Chief of the Russian Navy
 Diploma of the Commander-in-Chief of the Navy (2013)
 Diploma of the Minister of Defense of Russia (2015)
 Diploma of the Minister of Defense (2015)

References

External links 
Official website

Military schools in Russia
Educational institutions established in 1995
Military education and training in Russia
1995 establishments in Russia